The first season of Family Guy aired on Fox from January 31 to May 16, 1999, and consisted of seven episodes, making it the shortest season to date. The series follows the dysfunctional Griffin family—father Peter, mother Lois, daughter Meg, son Chris, son Stewie and their anthropomorphic dog Brian, all of whom reside in their hometown of Quahog. The show features the voices of series creator Seth MacFarlane, Alex Borstein, Seth Green, and Lacey Chabert in the roles of the Griffin family. The executive producers for the first season were David Zuckerman and MacFarlane. It is also the only full season to feature Chabert, before she was replaced by Mila Kunis for the rest of the series' run, starting with the season two episode "Da Boom".

The series premiere, "Death Has a Shadow", was broadcast directly after Super Bowl XXXIII and was watched by 22.01 million viewers. The series received praise from most critics, particularly "I Never Met the Dead Man" and "Brian: Portrait of a Dog", however some critics disliked the themes of the episodes. The Volume One DVD box set, including all seven episodes and the second season, was released in Region 1 on April 15, 2003, Region 2 on November 12, 2001, and Region 4 on October 20, 2003. The series has since been released in syndication.

MacFarlane conceived the idea for Family Guy in 1995, while studying animation at the Rhode Island School of Design (RISD). There, he created his thesis film The Life of Larry, which his professor at RISD later submitted to Hanna-Barbera; this led to MacFarlane being hired by the company. Executives at Fox saw the Larry shorts and contracted MacFarlane to create a series based on the characters entitled Family Guy. While working on the series, Larry and his dog Steve slowly evolved into Peter and Brian; the rest of the series characters were added later.

Development

Conception

Seth MacFarlane conceived the idea for Family Guy in 1995 while studying animation at the Rhode Island School of Design (RISD). There he created his thesis film The Life of Larry, which his professor at RISD later submitted to Hanna-Barbera; this led to MacFarlane being hired by the company. In 1996, MacFarlane created a sequel to The Life of Larry entitled Larry and Steve, which featured a middle-aged character named Larry and an intellectual dog, Steve; the short was broadcast in 1997 as one of Cartoon Network's World Premiere Toons.

Executives at Fox saw the Larry shorts and contracted MacFarlane to create a series based on the characters entitled Family Guy. Fox proposed that MacFarlane complete a 15-minute short, and gave him a budget of $50,000. Several aspects of Family Guy were inspired by the Larry shorts. While working on the series, Larry and Steve slowly evolved into Peter and Brian. After the pilot aired, the series was green-lit.

Crew

The season aired on Fox Broadcasting Company in the United States. David Zuckerman and MacFarlane were the executive producers for the season; the latter also acted as show runner. The producer for the season was Sherry Gunther, with Mike Barker and Matthew Weitzman serving as co-producers. Other producers included Craig Hoffman, Danny Smith, Gary Janetti, and John Riggi.

The writing staff included MacFarlane, Chris Sheridan, Neil Goldman, Garrett Donovan, Ricky Blitt, Andrew Gormley, supervising producers Danny Smith and Gary Janetti, co-producers Matt Weitzman and Mike Barker, and voice actor Mike Henry. There were six directors for the seven episodes, with Michael DiMartino directing two. Peter Shin acted as the supervising director for the entire season. Walter Murphy composed the season's music tracks, while Stan Jones edited them.

Cast

Season one had a cast of four main actors. MacFarlane voiced Peter Griffin, a blue-collar worker and the patriarch of the Griffin family. The family's evil-genius baby Stewie and their anthropromorphic pet dog Brian, were also voiced by MacFarlane. Other members of the family include Peter's responsible but rebellious wife Lois Griffin, voiced by Alex Borstein; their angsty and self-loathing teenage daughter Meg, voiced by Lacey Chabert; and their goofy but lovable teenage son Chris, voiced by Seth Green. Starting with the third episode of the  second season, Chabert was eventually replaced by Mila Kunis for the rest of the series' run.

The season had a number of secondary characters including Lori Alan as Diane Simmons, a local news anchor; Mike Henry as Cleveland Brown, a neighbor and friend of the Griffins; Patrick Warburton as Joe Swanson, a handicapped neighbor; and Jennifer Tilly as Bonnie Swanson, Joe's pregnant wife. Other recurring characters included Carlos Alazraqui as Peter's boss Jonathan Weed, and Phil LaMarr as Ollie Williams. Cartoonist Butch Hartman voiced several minor characters.

Writing
For the first season, the writers shared a single office lent to them by the King of the Hill production crew. A majority of the writers had to agree on an episode idea before sending it to MacFarlane for approval; the concepts ultimately had to receive endorsement from Fox before production could begin. In interviews and on the DVD commentary of season one, MacFarlane explained that he is a fan of 1930s and 1940s radio programs, particularly the radio thriller anthology Suspense; thus the early episode had titles such as "Death Has a Shadow" and "Mind Over Murder". The team eventually dropped this naming convention after the novelty wore off.

Episodes

Reception

Ahsan Haque of IGN called the first season of Family Guy "extremely short but groundbreaking". Haque also named "Brian: Portrait of a Dog" and "I Never Met the Dead Man" as two of the best in the series. In 2008, IGN included Peter's idea of attaching a cardboard cutout of a television set around his waist from "I Never Met the Dead Man" in their list of "Peter Griffin's Top 10 Craziest Ideas". Later in 2009, they included Stewie's plan to freeze broccoli crops from the same episode in their list of "Stewie's Top 10 Most Diabolical Evil Plans". Another IGN editor, Jeremy Conrad, stated: "There aren't many shows on TV that are this sharp, or brave enough to offend everyone on the face of the planet. [...] If you find offensive humor funny, chances are you'll love this show."

David Williams from the DVD Movie Guide gave Volume One of the Family Guy a positive review, saying that the first season did well in introducing the characters of the series; he ended his review as "If you’re a fan of shows like The Simpsons, South Park, Futurama, or Married... with Children and enjoy your humor topical, dry, and with tongue firmly planted in cheek, then Family Guy is right up your alley". Aaron Beierle of DVD Talk said at the end of his review, "Often brilliant, extremely witty and darkly hilarious, Family Guy was unfortunately cancelled after Fox bumped it around six or seven different time slots. Fans of the show should definitely pick up this terrific sets , while those who haven't seen it should consider giving it a look. Highly recommended". Josh Wolk of Entertainment Weekly gave volume one a B, saying that "Family Guy Volume One: Seasons 1 & 2 rips through edgy gags, TV references, and fantasy sequences (some of which are hilariously inspired), but Fox's other buffoonish family has none of The Simpsons''' heart. As Homer and family have shown, a cartoon doesn't always have to be this cartoonish".

Mixed assessments came from Robin Pierson of The TV Critic, giving the season an overall mixed score of 59 out of 100. Though he praised the series as "a different kind of animated comedy which clearly sets out to do jokes which other cartoons can't do" and found "enough promise to believe the show could become really funny", he criticized the season's "slightly lame collection of flashback jokes." Pierson considered "I Never Met the Dead Man" to be the best episode of the season, and regarded "The Son Also Draws" as the season's poorest. The ending joke of "The Son Also Draws" (which consisted of Peter stating that "Canada sucks"), caused controversy with Canadian viewers. Ken Tucker gave the series a D in Entertainment Weekly, calling the animation clunky, which he said made Hanna-Barbera's animation look  state-of-the-art. He also hoped that smart people would use the Family Guy'' half hour to turn off the television set and start a debate over the air strikes in Kosovo. The premiere of Family Guy was the Super Bowl XXXIII lead out program, achieving a total of 22.01 million viewers.

Home media release
The first and second seasons were released under the title Family Guy Volume One; this standard four-disc DVD box set debuted in Region 1 on April 15, 2003. Distributed by 20th Century Fox Home Entertainment, it included several DVD extras such as episode commentaries, behind-the-scenes footage, and online promo spots. The same episodes, without the special features, were released in Region 2 on November 12, 2001, and in Region 4 on October 20, 2003.

References

General
 
 Family Guy season one episode guide. IGN. Retrieved July 27, 2010.

Specific

External links

 
Family Guy seasons
1999 American television seasons